Gerry Becker (April 11, 1951 – April 13, 2019) was an American theatre, film, and television actor.

Early life 
Born in St. Louis, Missouri to a family of priests, Becker studied for the priesthood with Jesuits for three years before dropping out. He earned a bachelor's degree in English from the University of Missouri and a master's degree in theatre from Saint Louis University.

Career 
He was associated with Remains Theatre and Steppenwolf Theatre Company in the Chicago, Illinois area. 

He had the lead role in Bernard Slade's Romantic Comedy at Pheasant Run in St. Charles, Illinois in 1981. Mary Yaney of The Herald of Crystal Lake, Illinois noted that he did an "excellent job" as the "self-centered, but loveable writer".

He appeared in a National Jewish Theatre production of Grown Ups by Jules Feiffer in 1987. A review noted, "Becker slices on the cutting edge in everything he does. All the empathy is blanched from the character leaving it less admirable. That is the character, for Becker's piercing performance is just fine".

In 1991, he appeared in Northlight Theatre's production of Ibsen's An Enemy of the People reads, "To his great credit, Gerry Becker, as [Thomas] Stockman, delivers [a] famous outcry with genuine passion and oratorical skill despite being costumed in a bright green tail coat so that he looks like a refugee from A Christmas Carol".

In 1992, he appeared as Mr. Wagner in Raymond J. Barry's Once in Doubt with Remains Theatre Company in Chicago. Variety's review noted that "Becker is a bit too meek as the curious interloper". A review in The Times of Munster, Indiana criticized the production, but praised the acting, noting that Becker and his costar William Petersen "give as good a they get in this bizarre triangle" and that "the trio keep the script taut and still extract a good deal of humor from the dialogue. So even when everything they say seems arbitrary and stilted they grab us with the sheer force of their acting". May found his acting "beautiful".

He performed on Broadway in the Steppenwolf Theatre production of The Song of Jacob Zulu in 1993.

In 1995, he starred in the off-Broadway production of three one-act dark comedy plays, Death Defying Acts, by David Mamet (An Interview), Elaine May (Hotline), and Woody Allen (Central Park West), at the Variety Arts Theatre in New York, Stamford, and Philadelphia. A review of the production's run at Stamford Center read, "Gerry Becker makes Howard a perfect Allen type, a failed writer who is better in the kitchen than in the boudoir". Theatre critic Michael Kuchwara of the Associated Press criticized Mamet's writing but said that Becker "as Cheshire catlike inquisitor, and Paul Guilfoyle [...] lob Mamet's lines back and forth like a couple of tennis pros. Neither man drops the ball". In his review of the production, Vince Canby of The New York Times wrote that Becker's and Paul Guilfoyle's performances in Mamet's play were "acted to dry, caustic perfection" and that in Allen's play that Becker and Guilfoyle were "splendid as the would-be guilty parties in liaisons that inevitably fail". Howard Kissel of Daily News wrote, "Gerry Becker is uproarious as the manic depressive" and "Becker brings a believable intensity to the hotline volunteer in May's play".

In addition to his theatre work, he appeared in many films including Donnie Brasco, sometimes in a leading role, as in Man on the Moon.

Personal life 
Becker began drinking in his adolescence but was sober 10 years in 1995.

Becker died on April 13, 2019, due to complications from diabetes.

He had a wife, Lucy, who he met while performing in a show at the Court Theatre.

Selected filmography

Films

Men Don't Leave (1990) - Uncle Hugh
Home Alone (1990) - Officer #1
Hard Promises (1991) - Minister
The Public Eye (1992) - Inspector Conklin
Hoffa (1992) - Business Negotiator
Rudy (1993) - Father Ted
Roommates (1995) - Dr. Minceberg
Die Hard with a Vengeance (1995) - Larry Griffith
Stonewall (1995) - Mattachine Speaker
Eraser (1996) - Morehart
Sleepers (1996) - Forensics Expert
Extreme Measures (1996) - Dr. Gene Spitelli
Donnie Brasco (1997) - Dean Blandford FBI
The Game (1997) - New Member Ted
Happiness (1998) - Psychiatrist
A Perfect Murder (1998) - Roger Brill
Celebrity (1998) - Jay Tepper - Glenwood High Alumnus
Mystery Men (1999) - Banyon
Mickey Blue Eyes (1999) - FBI Agent Bob Connell
Game Day (1999) - Fred Wilson
Mystery, Alaska (1999) - Players' Union Lawyer
Story of a Bad Boy (1999) - Mr. Fontaine
Man on the Moon (1999) - Stanley Kaufman - Andy's Father
The Cell (2000) - Dr. Barry Cooperman
Spider-Man (2002) - Maximilian Fargas
Blood Work (2002) - Mr. Toliver
Trapped (2002) - Dr. Stein
Marci X (2003) - Dr. Skellar
Death of a President (2006) - Leon Blumenthal
Perfect Stranger (2007) - Jon Kirshenbaum

Television films and specials

Meyer, The Killing Floor, PBS, 1984
Larry, The Imposter, ABC, 1984
Ed Boyer, Howard Beach: Making a Case for Murder (also known as In the Line of Duty: Howard *Beach:Making a Case for Murder and Skin), NBC, 1989
Judge O'Neill, In the Shadow of a Killer, NBC, 1992
Samuel Adler, Legacy of Lies, USA Network, 1992
Captain Pickering, The Hunley, TNT, 1999
Ted Tinling, When Billie Beat Bobby (also known as Billie contre Bobby: La bataille des sexes), ABC, 2001
Walt Rostow, Path to War, HBO, 2002

Television episodes
John Sherman, "Snatched," Law & Order, NBC, 1994
"Our Lady of Cement," The Cosby Mysteries, NBC, 1994
Mr. Goldman, "Simone Says," NYPD Blue, ABC, 1994
Max Petrov, "The Skin Trade," The Untouchables, 1994
Dr. Neal Latham, "Switch," Law & Order, NBC, 1995
Davidoff, "Fun City," New York News, CBS, 1995
Arnold Cassell, "Moby Greg," NYPD Blue, ABC, 1996
Rupert, Cosby, CBS, 1996
Thomas Robbins, "Nullification," Law & Order, NBC, 1997
Attorney Stone, "Fools Night Out," Ally McBeal, Fox, 1998
Dr. Cosimi, "Three Men and a Little Lady," Spin City, ABC, 1998
Leo Latimer, New York Undercover, Fox, 1998
Mr. Bickel, "The Music Man," "The Thin Black Line," The Hughleys, ABC, 2000
"Unnecessary Roughness," Judging Amy, CBS, 2000
Dr. Michaels, "Faith," Walker, Texas Ranger, CBS, 2000
"Blood Money,"  "Reprise," "Dead End," Angel (also known as Angel: The Series), The WB, 2001 - Nathan Reed
David Leary, "Blown Away," Philly, ABC, 2001
Judge Stanton, "Lolita?," "Mothers of the Disappeared," The Guardian, CBS, 2001, 2002
Chester Glass, "The Greenhouse Effect," The District, CBS, 2002
Network News President #1, "The Black Vera Wang," The West Wing, NBC, 2002
Ramus, "Witches in Tights," Charmed, The WB, 2002
Robert, "Cliff Mantegna," Nip/Tuck, FX Channel, 2003
"Yankee White," Navy NCIS: Naval Criminal Investigative Service (also known as NCIS and NCIS: *Naval Criminal Investigative Service), CBS, 2003
"Three Boys and a Gun," The Jury, Fox, 2004
Gerard Wills, "Can I Get a Witness?," "Obsession," Law & Order, NBC, 2004, 2005
Myron Stone, "Those Lips, That Hand," Ally, Fox.

References

External links

1951 births
2019 deaths
American male film actors
American male stage actors
American male television actors
Male actors from St. Louis
Saint Louis University alumni
University of Missouri alumni